Heidi is a Germanic feminine given name. It became an internationally popular first name as a direct result of the Swiss children's book, Heidi. It can sometimes be an affectionate diminutive of the name Adelheid (English: Adelaide), which means "nobility" or, more loosely, "of noble birth". The name began to be used in the English-speaking world shortly after the 1937 Shirley Temple movie adaptation of the novel. In German-speaking countries, Heidi is also used as a diminutive for other names, such as Heidrun, Heidelinde, and Heidemarie.

Given name

A–F
Heidi Alexander (born 1975), British politician
Heidi Allen (born 1975), British politician
Heidi Andersson (born 1981), Swedish armwrestler
Heidi Andreasen (born 1985), Faroese swimmer
Heidi Androl (born 1980), candidate for The Apprentice:Los Angeles (US Season 6, 2005)
Heidi Astrup (born 1972), Danish handball player
Heidi Baker (born 1959), American missionary in Africa
Heidi Barrett (born 1958), Californian winemaker
Heidi Becker-Ramlow (1954–1987), German Olympic diver
Heidi Behrens-Benedict, American politician
Heidi Berry (born 1958), American singer-songwriter
Heidi Biebl (1941–2022), German alpine skier
Heidi Blickenstaff (born 1971), American actress
Heidi Bohay (born 1959), American actress
Heidi Burge (born 1971), American basketball player
Heidi Chu (born 1977), Miss Hong Kong contestant
Heidi Collins (born 1967), American correspondent and news anchor
Heidi Cortez (born 1981), American model
Heidi Crowter, English disability rights advocate
Heidi W. Durrow (born 1969), American author
Heidi-Elke Gaugel (born 1959), German athlete
Heidi Li Feldman, American law professor
Heidi Fleiss (born 1965), former American procuress
Heidi Foss, Canadian TV writer

G–M
Heidi Grande Røys (born 1967), Norwegian politician
Heidi Groskreutz (born 1981), American ballroom dancer
Heidi Harley (born 1969), American linguist
Heidi Harris, American radio personality
Heidi Hautala (born 1955), Finnish politician
Heidi Heitkamp (born 1955), American lawyer, and politician
Heidi Herzon, American TV producer
Heidi Hollinger (born 1968), Canadian photographer
Heidi Julavits (born 1969), American author
Heidi Kabel (1914–2010), German musician and actress
Heidi Klum (born 1973), German model
Heidi Kozak (born 1963), American actress
Heidi Larssen (born 1951), Norwegian politician
 Heidi Lee, Hong Kong singer
Heidi Lenhart (born 1973), American actress
Heidi Lucas (born 1977), American actress
Heidi Lück (born 1943), German politician
Heidi Løke (born 1982), Norwegian handball player
Heidi MacDonald, American journalist
Heidi Mark (born 1971), American Playboy Playmate
Heidi Miller (born 1950s), American female bodybuilder
Heidi Safia Mirza (born 1958), British academic
Heidi Mohr (1967–2019), German footballer 
Heidi Montag (born 1986), American television personality
Heidi Lee Morgan (born 1967), American female professional wrestler
Heidi Mueller (born 1982), American actress
Heidi Murkoff, American author

N–Z
Heidi Neumark (born 1954), American spiritual writer
Heidi Newfield (born 1970), American country music singer and former frontwoman of "Trick Pony"
Heidi Nordby Lunde (born 1973), Norwegian politician
Heidi Parviainen (born 1979), Finnish singer and songwriter
Heidi Pelttari (born 1985), Finnish ice hockey player
Heidi Postlewait, former UN social worker
Heidi Puurula (born 1971), Finnish singer
Heidi Rakels (born 1968), Belgian judoka
Heidi Range (born 1983), member of British girl group Sugababes
Heidi Ravven (born 1952), American professor
Heidi Roizen (born 1958), American businesswoman
Heidi Ryom (1955–2013), Danish ballerina and educator
Heidi Sager (1939–2004), German-Australian canoeist
Heidi Schanz (born 1972/1973), American-German actress
Heidi Schmid (born 1938), German fencer
Heidi Schüller (born 1950), German athlete
Heidi Shepherd, American singer
Heidi Sorenson (born 1960), Danish-Canadian Playboy Playmate
Heidi Sørensen (born 1970), Norwegian politician
Heidi Soulsby, British politician from Guernsey
Heidi Støre (born 1963), Norwegian footballer
Heidi Sundal (born 1962), Norwegian handball player
Heidi Swedberg (born 1966), American actress
Heidi Talbot (born 1980), Irish folk singer
Heidi Thomas (born 1962), English screenwriter and playwright
Heidi Tjugum (born 1973), Norwegian handball player
Heidi Valkenburg, Australian actress
Heidi VanDerveer (born 1964), American basketball coach
Heidi Von Gunden, American musicologist
Heidi Weisel (1961/1962–2021), American fashion designer
Heidi Weng (born 1991), Norwegian cross-country skier
Heidi Williams (born 1981), American attorney and judge
Heidi Wunderli-Allenspach (born 1947), Swiss biologist and first women rector of ETH Zurich
Heidi Yuen (born 1992), Hong Kong athlete
Heidi Zeigler (born 1979), American child actress
Heidi Zeller-Bähler (born 1967), Swiss alpine skier
Heidi Zimmer, American deaf mountain climber
Heidi Zurbriggen (born 1967), Swiss alpine skier

See also
Heide (name)

Feminine given names
German feminine given names
Dutch feminine given names
Norwegian feminine given names
Swedish feminine given names
Finnish feminine given names
Danish feminine given names
Icelandic feminine given names
Estonian feminine given names
English feminine given names
Scandinavian feminine given names
Swiss feminine given names